is a railway station on the Shinano Railway Line in Oiwake, in the town of Karuizawa, Nagano, Japan, operated by the third-sector railway operating company Shinano Railway.

Lines
Shinano-Oiwake Station is served by the 65.1 km Shinano Railway Line, and is 7.2 kilometers from the starting point of the line at Karuizawa Station.

Station layout
The station consists of two ground-level opposed side platforms serving two tracks, connected to the station building by a footbridge. The station is unattended.

Platforms

Adjacent stations

History
The station opened on 1 October 1923.

Passenger statistics
In fiscal 2011, the station was used by an average of 456 passengers daily.

Surrounding area
Site of Oiwake-juku

See also
 List of railway stations in Japan

References

External links

  

Railway stations in Nagano Prefecture
Railway stations in Japan opened in 1923
Shinano Railway Line
Karuizawa, Nagano